Igor Valeev (born 9 January 1981) is a retired Russian professional ice hockey player who last played for the Edinburgh Capitals. Valeev previously played with Chelmet Chelyabinsk in the Vysshaya hokkeinaya liga (VHL), and was selected by the St. Louis Blues in the fourth round (122nd overall) of the 2001 NHL Entry Draft.

Career statistics

References

External links
 

1981 births
Living people
Arystan Temirtau players
Buran Voronezh players
Edinburgh Capitals players
Kazzinc-Torpedo players
Lethbridge Hurricanes players
HC Mechel players
Molot-Prikamye Perm players
Muskegon Fury players
North Bay Centennials players
People from Snezhinsk
Peoria Rivermen (ECHL) players
Russian ice hockey left wingers
Saskatoon Blades players
St. Louis Blues draft picks
Swift Current Broncos players
Traktor Chelyabinsk players
Worcester IceCats players
Sportspeople from Chelyabinsk Oblast
Russian expatriate ice hockey people
Russian expatriate sportspeople in Scotland
Russian expatriate sportspeople in Kazakhstan
Russian expatriate sportspeople in the United States
Russian expatriate sportspeople in Canada
Expatriate ice hockey players in Kazakhstan
Expatriate ice hockey players in the United States
Expatriate ice hockey players in Scotland
Expatriate ice hockey players in Canada